Bellizzi Field is a ballpark located in Albany, New York, United States. It is located at the Christian Plumeri Sports Complex. It is home to the College of Saint Rose Golden Knights and the former home of the Albany Dutchmen of the Perfect Game Collegiate Baseball League. It opened in 2010 and seats about 1,000 people.

Baseball venues in New York (state)
2010 establishments in New York (state)
Sports venues completed in 2010
College baseball venues in the United States
Sports venues in Albany, New York